Zunyite is a sorosilicate mineral, Al13Si5O20(OH,F)18Cl, composed of aluminium, silicon, hydrogen, chlorine, oxygen, and fluorine.

Occurrence

Zunyite occurs in highly aluminous shales and hydrothermally altered volcanic rocks. It occurs in association with pyrophyllite, kaolinite, alunite, diaspore, rutile, pyrite, hematite and quartz.

It was discovered in 1884, and named for its discovery site, the Zuni mine in the Silverton District, San Juan County, Colorado.

References

 Glendale Community College; retrieved March 26, 2005.
 Euromin; retrieved March 26, 2005.

Aluminium minerals
Halide minerals
Sorosilicates
Cubic minerals
Minerals in space group 216
San Juan County, Colorado